HkB 600 were electric teak wagons formerly used on the Oslo Metro of Oslo, Norway. 12 double-car multiple units were built by Skabo Jernbanevognfabrikk and AEG from 1951 to 1956. The wagons were taken out of use in 1995, and replaced with OS T2000 wagons.

References

Oslo Metro stock